Beech Grove is an unincorporated community in Carter County, Kentucky, United States.

References

Unincorporated communities in Carter County, Kentucky
Unincorporated communities in Kentucky